Sabah al-Din Abu Qaws, also known as Sabah Fakhri (  North Levantine ; May 2, 1933 – November 2, 2021), was a Syrian tenor singer from Aleppo.

With over 50 years of fame and popularity as a singer, Sabah Fakhri modified and popularized the then-fading forms of traditional Arabic music Muwashahat and Qudud Halabiya. He was well known for his strong vocals, execution of Maqamat and harmony, as well as his charismatic performances.

Biography 
Sabah was born in Aleppo Syria 1933 and enrolled in the Academy of Arabic Music of Aleppo. He later studied at the Academy of Damascus, from which he graduated in 1948. He was given the stage name "Fakhri" by his mentor, Syrian nationalist leader Fakhri al-Barudi, who encouraged him as a young boy to stay in Syria and not travel to Italy. One of Fakhri's earliest performances was in 1948 at the Presidential Palace in Damascus, before President Shukri al-Quwatli and Prime Minister Jamil Mardam Bey. Unlike many Arab artists, he never studied or worked in Cairo, insisting that his fame is linked to the artistic heritage of his homeland, Syria.

Sabah Fakhri was one of the very few singers from Arabic-speaking countries to have reached widespread popularity by singing in the Arabic language (including Europe, Asia, the Americas, and Australia). His name is enshrined in the Guinness Book of Records for his prowess in Caracas, Venezuela, where he sang continuously for 10 hours without pause.

In 1998, Fakhri became a member of the Syrian parliament for the session, as a representative of artists.

Interaction with the audience 
When he performed, Fakhri insisted on interacting with his audience. Before singing, he insisted on having a good atmosphere by having good musicians and an appropriate sound system. While performing he asked for the lights to remain on, to interact with the audience. He said that the audience played a key role in bringing out the performer's creativity. The audience should be aware of the music and poetry, so they would value the music given to them.

Death 
Fakhri died on November 2, 2021, in Damascus, aged 88.

Major works 
Fakhri sang many traditional songs from Aleppo, based on the poems of Abu Firas al-Hamdani, Al-Mutanabbi and other poets. He also worked with contemporary composers. Some of his most popular songs are:
 Yā Hādī al-‘Ess / Mālek Yā Ḥelwa(t) Mālek
 Khamrat el-Ḥobb
 Yā Ṭīra(t) Ṭīrī
 Fōg el-Nakhal (Iraqi song)
 ’Adduka al-Mayāss
 Yā Māl el-Shām
 Muwashshaḥ Imlīlī / Yā Shādī el-Alḥān
 Eba‘atlī Jawwāb
 Ah Yā Ḥalō

Awards 
On 12 February 2007, Fakhri was awarded the Syrian Order of Merit of Excellent Degree by the Syrian president Bashar al-Assad in recognition of his achievements in serving and his role in reviving the artistic heritage of Syria.

Honors 

: Commander of the National Order of the Cedar.
: Grand Cordon of the Order of Ouissam Alaouite.
: Grand Cordon of the Order of Civil Merit. 
: Grand Cordon of the Order of Civil Merit. 
: Grand Cordon of the National Order of Merit.

References

External links 
 Sabah Fakhri Home Page
 

1933 births
2021 deaths
Performers of Islamic music
Syrian Muslims
20th-century Syrian male singers
People from Aleppo
Members of the People's Assembly of Syria
Singers who perform in Classical Arabic
Tenors